A pattern is an original object used to make copies, or a set of repeating objects in a decorative design and in other disciplines. 

Pattern, patterns, or patterning may also refer to:

Mathematics, science, and technology

Computing
 Software design pattern, a standard form for a solution to common problems in software design.
 Architectural pattern, for software architecture
 Interaction design pattern, used in interaction design / human-computer interaction
 Pattern recognition, in machine learning
 In machine learning, a non-null finite sequence of constant and variable symbols
 Regular expression, often called a pattern

Other
 Airfield traffic pattern, the traffic flow immediately surrounding a runway
 Design pattern, a standard form for a solution to common problems in design
Pattern book, a book of architectural designs
 Pattern (architecture), a standard form (pattern language) for a solution to common problems in architecture
 Software design pattern (see above)
 Pattern formation, the processes and mechanisms by which patterns such as the stripes of animals form; also, a science dealing with outcomes of self-organisation
 Pattern language, a structured method of describing good design practices
 Pattern theory, a mathematical formalism to describe knowledge of the world as patterns
 Patterns in nature, the visible regularities of form found in nature and explained by science
 Pedagogical patterns
 In ethnomethodology, a (generally non-rigid) routine

Manufacturing

 Multiple patterning, a class of technologies for manufacturing integrated circuits
 Pattern (casting), a replica of the object to be cast
 Pattern coin, a coin struck to test a new design, alloy, or method of manufacture
 Pattern (sewing), the original garment, or a paper template, from which other garments are copied and produced

Fiction
 Patterns (Kraft Television Theatre), a 1955 live television drama written by Rod Serling
 Patterns (film), a 1956 film based on the TV show
 Patterns, a 1989 novel by Pat Cadigan

Music
 Patterns, a 1975 album by Kiki Dee
 Patterns (album), by Bobby Hutcherson, released in 1980
Patterns (EP), an EP by Repeater
Patterns, an alternative title of the Modern Jazz Quartet's album Music from Odds Against Tomorrow
 "Patterns" (Paul Simon song)
 "Patterns", a polka song by "Weird Al" Yankovic
 Patterns (Small Faces song), 1967

Other uses
 Pattern (devotional), in Irish Catholicism, the devotional practices associated with a patron saint
 Patterns II, a pencil and paper game designed by Sid Sackson
 Patterns (video game), a building game for personal computers
 Juggling pattern, a trick performed while juggling

See also
 The Pattern (disambiguation)